KZRR (94.1 FM, "94 Rock") is a commercial radio station in Albuquerque, New Mexico, broadcasting to the Albuquerque-Santa Fe, New Mexico, area.  KZRR airs a mainstream rock radio format and is owned by iHeartMedia, Inc.  The radio studios and offices are in Northeast Albuquerque.

KZRR has an effective radiated power (ERP) of 22,500 watts.  The transmitter tower is atop Sandia Crest east of the city.  It broadcasts using HD Radio technology.  The HD-2 digital subchannel features an urban contemporary format, known as "Power 100.9"; that subchannel feeds 250 watt FM translator K265CA at 100.9 MHz.

Personalities
Weekday mornings feature Swami Rob, Skyler and Phil Mahoney.  Skyler also is heard in middays.  Ron "Big Rig" Michaels, voice-tracked from Tampa, hosts afternoon drive time.

History

Early years
On June 25, 1961, the station signed on as KDEF-FM, mostly simulcasting sister station KDEF (1150 AM). The station was initially heard from 11 a.m. to 11 p.m., but in May 1962, it began full-time broadcasting. In September 1962, KDEF-AM-FM were sold by owner Frank Quinn to a Philadelphia group.

Doubleday Broadcasting purchased the stations in 1965, and by about 1970, KDEF-FM was operated by the University of Albuquerque as a student run station. Media Horizons purchased the stations in 1973, and moved the studios from downtown to the northeast heights.

In March 1976, KDEF-FM was sold to Gaylord Broadcasting Co. for $150,000, and changed call letters to KRKE-FM.  That same call sign was used on 610 AM, which Gaylord had purchased in 1973. (KDEF AM was later sold to a different owner.) Plans also included moving the transmitter to Sandia Crest. The format on KRKE-FM was initially Modern Country. By the end of that year the format was listed as "Automated Rock" while a 1977

Rock format
Later in 1977, the station picked up the Abrams/Burkhart "Superstars" Album-oriented Rock format.  That was the first time the station began using the "94 Rock" moniker.

In January 1980, Gaylord sold KRKE AM-FM to the Journal Star station group for $4.5 million. In June, the call letters changed to KWXL still branded as "94 Rock". In March 1985, the stations were sold to Compass Communications. In April, the station changed its call letters back to KRKE-FM, intending to make station identification easier in morning and afternoon drive times, when it was simulcast with KRKE AM. The format was also changed to "Superstars II," with an emphasis on rock titles from the 1960s an 70s.  It also featured a Sunday morning jazz program intending to reach an older audience than KWXL's targeted 18-34 audience.

Switch to KZRR
In 1986, the stations were sold to Sandia Peak Broadcasters. In July, it changed to the current KZRR call sign, rebranding as "The New 94 Rock". KRKE AM changed to KZSS with an Adult Contemporary format, but in March 1988, it returned to simulcasting KZRR, citing problems of "public perception of the AM band".

In November 1986, the station began weekdays with morning "shock" radio show host TJ Trout. Trout was featured in nearly all billboard and television ads over the next couple of decades, helping keep station ratings high.  Trout retired in December 2011.

In 1993, Sandia Peak Broadcasters merged with Progressive Broadcasting which owned classic rock formatted KLSK 104.1 to become Twin Peaks Radio. By this time KZRR began to lean more on modern rock without completely changing to that format, promoting itself as "The Cutting Edge of Rock".

Trumper Communications
In 1996, Trumper Communications purchased KZRR, KZSS and KLSK, as well as modern rock KTEG (then on 107.9) and KHTZ. This also caused a legal dispute with TJ Trout, who sued the former owners when learning that his on-air name had been trademarked. Trout had resigned and had planned to start a new show on KKOB. Trumper resolved the issue by allowing Trout ownership of his name and remaining at KZRR. (Trout joined KKOB in 2019.)

Now clustered with classic rock and modern rock stations, the music format on KZRR had changed to playing mostly hard rock with an emphasis on music from the 1980s, 90s and early 2000s.  In 1999, KZRR was acquired by Clear Channel Communications.  Clear Channel changed in its name in 2014 to iHeartMedia, Inc.

References

External links
KZRR official website

Mainstream rock radio stations in the United States
ZRR
Radio stations established in 1961
IHeartMedia radio stations
1961 establishments in New Mexico